Deflowered is the second studio album by American queercore band Pansy Division, released in 1994 on Lookout! Records.

The cover features a photograph of Mark Ewert (left) and Moon Trent (right), taken by Marc Gellar. The two men also appear together on the cover of Pansy Division's 1996 album Wish I'd Taken Pictures and their 2016 album Quite Contrary.

Critical reception
AllMusic praised Deflowered for its "wry, silly and heartfelt" songwriting, singling out singer Jon Ginoli's "engagingly nerdish" vocals and "sweetly enjoyable" harmonizing with bassist Chris Freeman. Trouser Press wrote that "Ginoli’s melodic constructs are appreciably better on Deflowered; a raunchier guitar sound gives the improved second album more punk body." The Dallas Observer called the album "snappy" and "rollicking," and deemed it the band's best.

Track listing
All songs written by Jon Ginoli, except where noted.
"Reciprocate" – 2:52
"Groovy Underwear" – 3:38
"Anonymous" – 2:55
"Fluffy City" – 3:22
"James Bondage" (Chris Freeman) – 2:51
"Negative Queen" – 3:21
"Denny" (Ginoli, Healey) – 2:38
"Rachbottomoff" – 4:02
"Beercan Boy" – 2:13
"Kissed" (Ginoli, Freeman) – 2:29
"A Song of Remembrance for Old Boyfriends" (Jonathan Richman) – 3:26
"Deep Water" – 2:08
"Not Enough of You to Go Around" – 2:23
"New Pleasures" – 3:31
"Homosapien" (Pete Shelley) – 2:18

Personnel
Jon Ginoli – vocals, guitars
Chris Freeman – vocals, bass, lead vocals on track 5
Liam Hart – drums

References

1994 albums
Pansy Division albums
Lookout! Records albums